KWLL (95.3 FM) is a terrestrial American radio station, licensed to Gilmer, Texas, United States, broadcasting a Christian teaching format as "The Well". The station serves the Longview-Marshall area, is in full simulcast with its sister station KZWL Bullard, and is owned by the Educational Radio Foundation of East Texas, Inc.

History
The station went on the air as KNIF on September 9, 1980, originally owned by Jack Daniels. It was sold to Rick Reynolds and became KAEZ on December 5, 1986. On September 17, 1990, the station changed its call sign to KLSQ, on March 1, 1993 to KFRO-FM, on December 7, 1998 to KCGL, and on February 15, 1999 it returned to KFRO-FM,

From 1990 to 1993, 95.3 was an adult contemporary station as "Q-95."  After being adult contemporary, the station switched to oldies as a simulcast of KFRO and taking the KFRO-FM calls. KFRO-FM was an oldies station for many years. The oldies format that was simulcasted with KFRO 1370 AM eventually migrated fully to 95.3 FM. In 1998, KFRO-FM relaunched its oldies format with a simulcast on KPXI 100.7, which was just downgraded and moved to Overton. The 100.7 simulcast did not last very long. In 2001, KFRO-FM reimaged as "The Frog." In October 2003, KFRO-FM dropped its oldies format for a simulcast of regional Mexican KOYE 96.7, "K-Oye." At this time, both the stations reimaged as "La Super Invasora." The simulcast lasted only six months. Then the oldies format returned for a couple years. In Spring 2005, KFRO-FM switched to a simulcast of KLJT 102.3 and launched a soft adult contemporary format as "The Breeze." By 2007, "The Breeze" had evolved into a hot AC format. In June 2008, "The Breeze" relaunched as a Top 40/CHR station. This was the first time that the Tyler/Longview had a Top 40 station since KISX switched to urban AC in 2006.

On August 1, 2016, KFRO-FM and sister stations KLJT, KMPA, and KZXM were taken off the air and the staff of those stations were let go and locked out without warning by Susie Waller, the daughter of the deceased owner of the station, Dudley Waller. The website remained active through mid-August, but it was redirected to a "WordPress For Broadcasters" page due to the aforementioned lockout of staff, plus it could no longer stream any live broadcasts. The staff for "The Morning Madhouse" show apologized and thanked their listeners as well as explaining the incident in detail on the show's Facebook page.

On February 17, 2017, Waller Broadcasting filed for an extension of the Special Temporary Authority allowing KFRO-FM and its three sisters to remain silent for an additional 180 days. The application also stated that a buyer had been found for the station, and was expected to announce a deal to transfer the four stations licenses, pending F.C.C. approval, within the next 30 days.

On July 3, 2017, KFRO-FM returned to the air (simulcasted by KLJT) as "Fun Radio 102.3 & 95.3", rebirthing the former CHR/Top 40 format it had as "The Breeze".

On October 31, 2017, the license transfer from Waller Broadcasting to East Texas Results Media was granted for KFRO-FM and its three sister stations, KZXM, KMPA, and KLJT. The deal was consummated on March 8, 2018, at a purchase price of $1.2 million.

On June 10, 2019, East Texas Results Media filed to transfer the license of KFRO-FM and its three sister stations to Educational Radio Foundation of East Texas, who in turn has applied to turn all four facilities non-commercial. The Foundation broadcasts Christian programming.

"Fun 95.3 & 102.3" left the air in mid-July 2019, pending transfer of the licenses.

The sale of KFRO-FM and its three sister stations was consummated on October 8, 2019, with ERFET officially taking control of the licenses and facilities. ERFET has announced that KFRO-FM will no longer simulcast KLJT once it returns to the air, breaking the simulcast that had been in place for over a decade.

Educational Radio Foundation of East Texas announced that they would launch a full service Christian teaching format on both KFRO-FM and KZXM, branded as "The Well". The new format launched on April 20, 2020.

On July 22, 2022, the station changed its call sign to KWLL.

References

External links

Radio stations established in 1980
WLL
1980 establishments in Texas